Hydnellum scleropodium is a rare species of tooth fungus in the family Bankeraceae. It was described as new to science in 1964 by Canadian mycologist Kenneth A. Harrison. The fungus has been collected in Tennessee, North Carolina, and Nova Scotia, in both mixed and coniferous forest. The flesh has a strong, fragrant odor. Spines on the cap underside, blue in color, are up to 11 mm long.

References

External links

Fungi described in 1964
Fungi of North America
Inedible fungi
scleropodium